Friedrich (Fritz) Baumbach (born 8 September 1935 in Weimar, Germany) is a German International Correspondence Chess Grandmaster, most famous for being the eleventh ICCF World Champion, 1983–1989. He was also East German Champion in 1970.  

He tied for second place behind Mikhail Umansky in a "champion of champions" tournament, the ICCF 50 Years World Champion Jubilee. This was a special invitational correspondence tournament involving all living former ICCF World Champions.

Baumbach is a chemist by profession. He received his doctorate in 1966. Since 2000 he has been working as a freelance patent attorney.

References

External links
 
 
 
 

1935 births
Living people
German chess players
Correspondence chess grandmasters
World Correspondence Chess Champions
Chess FIDE Masters
Sportspeople from Weimar